Enocitabine (INN, marketed under the brand name Sunrabin) is a nucleoside analog used as chemotherapy.

Sunrabin contains the emulsifier HCO-60, which can cause allergic reactions.

References

  Sunrabin

Antineoplastic drugs